Puya humilis is a species in the genus Puya. This species is endemic to Bolivia.

References

humilis
Endemic flora of Bolivia